Toledonia is a genus of sea snails, marine gastropod molluscs in the family Cylichnidae.

Toledonia is the type genus of the subfamily Toledoniinae.

Description 
Toledonia was originally described by American malacologist William Healey Dall in 1902. Dall's original text (the type description) reads as follows:

Species 
Species within the genus Toledonia include:

 Toledonia brevior Eales, 1923
 Toledonia bullata (Gould, 1847) - Distribution: Falklands, Argentina. Length: 9.2 mm.
 Toledonia circumrosa (Thiele, 1904)
 Toledonia elata Thiele, 1912
 Toledonia epongensis Valdés, 2008
 Toledonia globosa Hedley, 1916
 Toledonia limnaeaeformis (E. A. Smith, 1879) - Distribution: Antarctica.
 Toledonia limnaeoides (Odhner, 1913) - Distribution: West Greenland. Length: 2.6 mm.
 Toledonia major (Hedley, 1911) - synonym: Toledonia elata J. Thiele, 1912 - Distribution: Subantarctic, South Sandwich Islands, South Shetlands; Antarctic Peninsula. Length: 6.6 mm. Found at depths up to 200 m.
 Toledonia media Thiele, 1912
 Toledonia neocaledonica Valdés, 2008
 Toledonia palmeri Dell, 1990 - Distribution: Antarctic. Length: 2.6 mm.
 Toledonia parelata Dell, 1990 - Distribution: Tierra del Fuego. Length: 6.1 mm. Found at depths between 80 m and 230 m.
 Toledonia perplexa Dall, 1902 - type species. Distribution: Argentina; Tierra del Fuego; Straits of Magellan; Falklands. Length: 3.2 mm. Description: found to depths of 230 m.
 Toledonia punctata J. Thiele, 1912 - Distribution: Subantarctic, Tierra del Fuego; South Georgia; Kerguelen. Length: 6 mm. Description: found at depths between 115 m and 567 m.
 Toledonia seguenzae (Watson, 1886)
 Toledonia striata J. Thiele, 1912 - Distribution: Antarctica.
 Toledonia succineaformis Powell, 1955 - Distribution: New Zealand.
 Toledonia vagabunda (Mabille, 1885) - Distribution: Tierra del Fuego. Length: 10 mm.
 Toledonia warenella Golding, 2010
Species brought into synonymy
 Toledonia hedleyi Powell, 1958: synonym of Toledonia major (Hedley, 1911)
 Toledonia normani (Friele, 1886): synonym of Ondina normani (Friele, 1886)
 Toledonia ringei (Strebel, 1905): synonym of Toledonia vagabunda (Mabille, 1885)
 Toledonia typica (Thiele, 1904): synonym of Toledonia limnaeaeformis (E. A. Smith, 1879)

References 
This article incorporates public domain text from the reference.
 Marcus Ev. (1976). A taxonomic survey of the genus Toledonia Dall, 1902 (Opisthobranchia: Diaphanidae). Zoologica Scripta 5:25-33.

External links 
 Toledonia at Antarctic Invertebrates
 Thiele, Johannes. "Die antarktischen schnecken und muscheln." Deutsche Südpolar-Expedition (1901–1903) 13 (1912): 183-286

Cylichnidae
Taxa named by William Healey Dall